The Sombrero Playhouse was a regional theatre in Phoenix, Arizona. It was built in March 1949, the first legitimate professional theater in Phoenix, though the city did have a long tradition of Little Theater. Major Broadway and Hollywood stars of the time performed on stage at the Sombrero, including Katharine Cornell, Helen Hayes, Kirk Douglas, Milton Berle, Billie Burke, Burgess Meredith, Walter Pidgeon, Tom Drake, Vincent Price, and Mary Astor. Despite its limited capacity, it was one of the most widely-known regional theaters in the Western United States during the 1950s and early 1960s. It presented recent Broadway hits (sometimes while they were still playing there), revivals, and on several occasions original productions that then went on national tour.

After 20 seasons of presenting plays, the Sombrero "went dark" after the 1968 season, became an art film house in 1976, before being sold and demolished in 1982.

Founding
William W. Merrill and Richard Charlton formed a partnership in June 1948 to explore the possibility of a theater in Phoenix. Merrill owned the summer stock Will-o-Way Playhouse in Birmingham, Michigan, while Charlton operated the Music Hall in Detroit. Charlton met Ann Lee at Sardi's in October 1948, where they discussed the idea of "winter stock" theater in the Southwest. She was a Texas-born Broadway actress who had founded a summer stock venue in Santa Fe, New Mexico. Merrill purchased property at 3535 East MacDowell Road in Phoenix, which held a barn that could be converted to a rustic theater. The new venue would be called Sombrero Playhouse, since it would be a western version of a "straw hat" (summer stock) theater. However, Merill lacked the funds to proceed with development.

Charlton and Lee took a long-term lease for an empty two-acre lot on Seventh Street near Camelback Road, on which a new theater would be built. He and Ann Lee formed a corporation with local notables as officers to fund the project, while he and Lee would be co-producers. Charlton went to Hollywood to recruit name talent for the opening season, while Lee persuaded the Phoenix City Council to clear scrub vegetation from the lot at no charge using city jail inmates as labor. The property actually lay outside the then city limits, but as a reporter covering the council noted, when Lee smiled none of the councilmen said "No". Ground-breaking at 4747 North Seventh Street for the $100,000 building began February 22, 1949, with the building completed in late March.

Merrill filed an injunction with Maricopa Superior Court to stop the use of the name "Sombrero Playhouse", which he had registered with the state in February 1949. Charlton countered with his own suit asking to dissolve his partnership with Merrill and for an accounting of the remaining assets. The name stayed on the theatre, which had its opening on March 29, 1949, with a performance of Born Yesterday, starring William Bendix, Audrey Totter, and Whit Bissell.

Seasonal activities

Winter drama
The Sombrero's season ran from January through March. The first three seasons, plays opened on Tuesdays and closed Sundays, generally with Wednesday and Saturday afternoon matinees, for a one-week run of eight performances. Beginning with the fourth season (1953), opening night was switched to Mondays, with Saturday night the closer. This lasted two seasons then reverted to the original Tuesday thru Sunday scheme for the remainder of its performing seasons.

The first season, originally advertised as 12 weeks, was revised to five weeks due to the theater's construction, then cut to four weeks. For subsequent years, the Sombrero's season usually ran for ten weeks, with a limited engagement of one week per production. This was part of the appeal for Hollywood stars, who wanted the cachet of a stage credit but didn't want to commit to an open-ended run. Seasons in the 1950s would sometimes be extended with bonus programs.

Cast and crew
Charlton formed American Productions Inc. to provide casts and plays for the Sombrero Playhouse Corporation. Ann Lee left the Sombrero before the 1957 season to resume acting full-time. Charlton then brought in associate producers to share production tasks. Directors, set designers and other technical crew were recruited seasonally, generally from outside Arizona since the state then had few opportunities for those crafts.

Bit parts and walk-on roles were filled by local actors, drama school apprentices, and an occasional Phoenix notable. A resident group of professional actors, directors, and technical crew were hired each season to support the name stars. While the stars stayed at nearby deluxe resorts, the others were housed first at the Echo Lodge in the Camelback Inn area. Later, adobe stables just south of the theater were converted into fourteen apartments, for use by the resident actors and crew. These were rented out on nine-month leases during off-season.

The facility
The playhouse had limited clearance above the proscenium arch backstage, no more than four feet, so sets couldn't be "flown", they had to be struck for changes. Special twelve-foot flats were designed for the limited space, instead of the usual fourteen-feet. A set workshop and storage facility was built behind the Sombrero Playhouse during winter 1953–1954; prior to that sets were stored outdoors as there was no room backstage.

A $15,000 rehearsal hall addition was built after the Sombrero's application for a liquor permit triggered a dispute with the nearby Silver Spur restaurant where casts had previously rehearsed. Just prior to the 1953 winter season, the theatre floor was remodeled to replace aisle steps with smooth concrete ramps. The entire playhouse complex had air-conditioning installed two months later.

By 1959 the city limits of Phoenix had expanded to encompass the Sombrero Theatre, which was renovated and hooked up to city water and sewer lines. Acoustics remained a problem throughout the Sombrero's existence, one reason why so few musicals were booked there.

Subscriptions
From the second season subscription tickets were offered. Subscriptions carried with them membership in the Backstage Club, a small private lounge added onto the theater building in 1952. Subscriptions were available in blocks of ten performances, which could be used for any production. By 1959 the Sombrero had over a thousand subscribers, and by 1961 had nearly doubled that figure.

Sidelines
The Backstage Club was enlarged and redecorated in 1953 to include a buffet supper area and piano bar. It was expanded into a full-service restaurant and nightclub for the general public during February 1956.

A drama school, the American Foundation for Theatre Arts was established during late 1958 at the Sombrero, with free tuition for up to ten apprentices.

The Backstage Club's Galaxy room was used for original local art exhibits starting in 1959. During the 1960s this became a separate business enterprise called Galaxy Galleries.

Apogee
The Sombrero's reputation had grown with the Hollywood community, helped in part by the producers opening an office in the Los Angeles area. The New York Times ran a half-page article profiling the success of the producers in recruiting, not only for their own theater but also for Broadway productions that needed a name star in a hurry. Ronald Reagan and Nancy Davis watched ZaSu Pitts in Ramshackle Inn at the Sombrero on their honeymoon in March 1952. Frank Lloyd Wright, Clare Booth Luce, and Ethel Merman were attendees at first nights. So was then first lady Mamie Eisenhower and her sister, accompanied by the Secret Service.

The years 1959 and 1960 were the high point for the Sombrero Playhouse. Guthrie McClintic and Sol Hurok produced the world premiere of their production of Dear Liar at the Sombrero in 1959, starring Katharine Cornell and Brian Aherne, with the playwright Jerome Kilty himself directing. The following year Helen Hayes starred in The Cherry Orchard.

Later seasons
The Phoenix Center for the Performing Arts was launched with large newspaper ads in January 1965. This offered two subscriptions: the Broadway Series, of plays at the Sombrero, and a Carnegie Hall Series of concerts and dance at Phoenix Union High School. A local columnist reported Charlton's plans for a new performing arts complex, but it appears the only outcome was Charlton styling himself artistic director and hiring others to take over production chores at the Sombrero.

Charlton was provoked by a scorching review of the 1965 season opening, that indicted "the Sombrero attitude". Critic William J. Nazzaro took exception to the slapdash production schedule of the Sombrero:
"What we saw last night was what one should expect at a theater that operates on the star system, where the management does not know what it will present even two or three weeks before the actual event... But what really needs correction is the Sombrero's attitude that a star can be engaged at the last minute, thrown into a vehicle with limited rehearsals, and come up with a winner".  
Charlton responded with a letter to the The Arizona Republic editor, acknowledging problems with the opening night performance, but denying that the Sombrero production method itself was at fault. However, Nazzaro was hardly the first local critic to make these observations.

Off-season activities
During the off-season the Sombrero was leased out for private and public use. The theater was used for a private children's drama group and city public theatre workshop programs during the late spring and summer, while the co-producers returned to Santa Fe to open Ann Lee's El Teatro for the summer season. During the late spring and fall first-run foreign films, sans concessions, were run. The Backstage Club was open year-round to members, and often featured entertainment and art shows.

Last years
Regular stage seasons ceased on March 31, 1968, with a production of The Torch-Bearers starring Cornelia Otis Skinner, Mildred Natwick, and Joe Flynn. Thereafter the facility was used intermittantly for showing films, as a summer stock workshop, and for special events. During April and May 1976 there was an attempt to revive legitimate drama with a production of Sleuth, but there was no follow-up. Summer 1976 saw the theater leased out to an art house business which showed second-run and classic films. As with many US art house cinemas at that time, it largely survived off midnight showings of The Rocky Horror Picture Show. Richard Charlton, who owned both the theater and the adjacent restaurant, tangled with the art house leasees during 1978 over access to a dirt parking lot on the premises and what Charlton characterised as "x-rated films". A Maricopa Superior Court judge ruled the ten-year lease was valid and the art house could continue showing films, but its patrons would have to park elsewhere.

Charlton filed for Chapter 11 bankruptcy in November 1980, and the theater and restaurant were purchased by AJ Properties in July 1981. The two buildings were to be demolished in favor of a multi-structure office complex. The Sombrero Theatre was torn down in 1982, with the property remaining an empty lot into 1983. Furnishings, antiques, paintings, and other artwork from the Sombrero Theatre were sold at a bankruptcy auction in November 1983.

Productions

1949-1958

1959-1968, 1976

Notes

References

Theatres in Arizona
1949 establishments in Arizona
Buildings and structures in Phoenix, Arizona
1980s disestablishments in Arizona